Huntingdale is an unincorporated community in Henry County, in the U.S. state of Missouri.

History
A post office called Huntingdale was established in 1856, and remained in operation until 1907. The community was named for a hunting ground near the original town site.

References

Unincorporated communities in Henry County, Missouri
Unincorporated communities in Missouri